Liuqiu or Lewchew is a Chinese place-name variously denoting:

 Liuqiu (medieval), a realm variously identified with the main island of Taiwan, the Penghu islands (Taiwan), and the Ryukyu islands (Japan)
 Ryukyu Islands, an archipelago southwest of the Japanese Home Islands (politically part of Japan)
 Liuqiu Island or Little Liuqiu, an island southwest of the main island of Taiwan (politically part of Taiwan)